Contredanse can refer to:
Contra dance, a social dance
Country dance, a social dance
Contredanse (organisation), is a documentation center for contemporary dance in Belgium